Melanie Lynn Booth (born August 24, 1984) is a Canadian retired soccer player. She last played for Sky Blue FC in the National Women's Soccer League and for the Canada women's national soccer team.

Early life
Booth was born in Burlington, Ontario, Canada.

University of Florida 
Booth attended the University of Florida in Gainesville, Florida, where she played for coach Becky Burleigh's Florida Gators women's soccer team from 2003 to 2005, before sitting out the 2006 season due to national team commitments. She returned to Florida in 2007 to complete her collegiate career, and graduated with a bachelor's degree in applied physiology and kinesiology in 2008.

Playing career

Club
She briefly played with Ottawa Fury Women.
On January 11, 2013, she joined Sky Blue FC in the new National Women's Soccer League.

International
Booth was 17 years old when she won her first cap with the Canadian national team on March 1, 2002, at the Algarve Cup (a 3–0 win over Scotland).

Booth earned 22 caps and scored three goals playing on the U-19 national team. She played every minute of Canada's six matches in the 2002 FIFA U-19 Women's World Championship, where Canada took the silver medal. She finished second with Canada at the 2006 Peace Queen Cup after a 0–1 loss to the United States in the final. She finished second with Canada at the 2006 CONCACAF Gold Cup after a 1–2 loss to the United States in the final.

She was a member of Canada's 2002 Algarve Cup and 2001 Nordic Cup teams.

Booth won a bronze medal with Canada at the 15th Pan American women's soccer tournament in July 2007 at Rio de Janeiro, Brazil. In 2007, she represented Canada at the FIFA Women's World Cup in China. She finished second with Canada at the 2008 CONCACAF Olympic qualification tournament (where Canada qualified for the Summer Olympics). She scored her first goal during the 4–0 win over Jamaica.

In the 2011 Pan-American women's soccer tournament, Booth helped Canada win the gold medal game against the defending champions, Brazil, by scoring on a penalty kick after extra-time.

Booth was named to the Canada squad for the 2012 London Olympics initially as an alternate. However, due to injuries to regular Canadian roster team players Emily Zurrer and Robyn Gayle, on Monday, July 30, 2012, the Canadian soccer coach officially added her to the team's official roster. She was later awarded an Olympic medal atop the podium at Wembley Stadium.

Booth stated, "I was standing next to Marie-Ève on the [Olympic] podium and I was the giddiest I had ever been. We were laughing about everything...Just being in Wembley in front of 60,000 people....After we got our medals (and bouquets), Marie-Ève said, 'I know these are just flowers but they're so beautiful.'"

Booth retired from international and club soccer on November 13, 2013.

See also 

Florida Gators
List of Florida Gators soccer players
List of University of Florida alumni

References

External links 
 
  (archive)
 

Living people
Women's association football defenders
Canadian expatriate sportspeople in the United States
Canadian expatriate women's soccer players
Canadian women's soccer players
Canada women's international soccer players
Expatriate women's soccer players in the United States
National Women's Soccer League players
Florida Gators women's soccer players
Footballers at the 2011 Pan American Games
Soccer people from Ontario
Sportspeople from Burlington, Ontario
Pan American Games medalists in football
Vancouver Whitecaps FC (women) players
USL W-League (1995–2015) players
Footballers at the 2012 Summer Olympics
Olympic medalists in football
Olympic bronze medalists for Canada
NJ/NY Gotham FC players
Pan American Games gold medalists for Canada
Medalists at the 2012 Summer Olympics
Pan American Games bronze medalists for Canada
2007 FIFA Women's World Cup players
Medalists at the 2011 Pan American Games
20th-century Canadian women
21st-century Canadian women
Ottawa Fury (women) players
Tampa Bay Hellenic players
1984 births